Chelem is a small beach in Yucatán, Mexico, in the Progreso Municipality.  It is near Progreso, on the coast north of the state capital of  Mérida. It is not very large, and consists mostly of small houses and restaurants.

Populated places in Yucatán